"Truckin" is a song by the Grateful Dead, which first appeared on their 1970 album American Beauty. It was recognized by the United States Library of Congress in 1997 as a national treasure.

Lyrics 
Written by band members Jerry Garcia, Bob Weir, Phil Lesh, and lyricist Robert Hunter, "Truckin molds classic Grateful Dead rhythms and instrumentation. The lyrics refer to a drug raid of the band's hotel lodgings in New Orleans during a concert tour earlier in 1970:

The song's climactic refrain, "What a long, strange trip it's been", has achieved widespread cultural use in the years since the song's release.

Composition 
"Truckin is associated with the blues and other early 20th-century forms of folk music.

"Truckin was considered a "catchy shuffle" by the band members. Garcia commented that "the early stuff we wrote that we tried to set to music was stiff because it wasn't really meant to be sung ... the result of [lyricist Robert Hunter getting into our touring world], the better he could write ... and the better we could create music around it." The communal, shared-group-experience feel of the song is brought home by the participation of all four of the group's chief songwriters (Garcia, Weir, Lesh, and Hunter), since, in Phil Lesh's words, "we took our experiences on the road and made it poetry," lyrically and musically. He goes on to say that "the last chorus defines the band itself."  Weir credited the band's 1967 experience in backing vocalese singer Jon Hendricks for helping Weir to enunciate the tongue-twister lyrics in Truckin's verses.

Release

The song was taken from the American Beauty album and edited down in length from five to three minutes for release as a single. In addition to being shorter, the single version had some audible differences compared to the album version: it featured sections of lead guitar in places where it's faded down on the album version, a heavy processed effect on Bob Weir's lead vocals in the verses, a different vocal track for the "Sometimes the lights..." portion, and is missing the album version's organ part.

The single reached number 64 on December 25, 1971 on the U.S. Pop Singles chart and stayed on the chart for eight weeks. "Truckin was the highest-charting pop single the group would have until the surprise top-ten performance of "Touch of Grey" sixteen years later.  Moreover, the album track was heavily played on progressive rock and album oriented rock radio stations and accordingly helped popularize the group among general rock audiences.

Live performances
"Truckin debuted as the first song on the first set on August 18, 1970 at the Fillmore West in San Francisco, the same performance where many of American Beauty'''s songs premiered.

A longer rendition, that turns into a jam, was included on the popular 1972 live album Europe '72'' segueing into "Epilogue", followed by "Prelude".

Over the band's long concert career, "Truckin was performed 520 times, making it the eighth-most performed Dead song.

Charts

Personnel
 Bob Weir – rhythm guitar, lead vocals
 Jerry Garcia – lead guitar, backing vocals
 Phil Lesh – bass, backing vocals
 Bill Kreutzmann – drums
 Mickey Hart – drums
 Howard Wales – organ

References

1970 singles
Grateful Dead songs
Songs about drugs
Songs with lyrics by Robert Hunter (lyricist)
Songs written by Jerry Garcia
Warner Records singles
Songs written by Phil Lesh
1970 songs